John Dale Martin (born January 2, 1983) is an American former professional baseball pitcher. He has played in Major League Baseball (MLB) for the Washington Nationals and in the KBO League for the Samsung Lions.

Martin is described as "a strike-thrower with a below average fastball who lives off of his changeup." His "fastball clocks in the high-80s, at best, but he locates it well while mixing in a cutter and changeup."

Professional career

Cleveland Indians
Martin was a first round pick by the Cleveland Indians in the 2001 Major League Baseball draft and played for the Indians' organization for eight years. In 2008, he spent his last season in the Indians organization with their Triple-A affiliate, the Buffalo Bisons.

Washington Nationals
On November 24, Martin signed with Washington as a minor-league free agent. In the first half of 2009, he went 8–3 in 15 starts with a 2.66 ERA for the Triple-A International League Syracuse Chiefs, recording 63 strikeouts and 10 walks.

On July 19, Martin was called up to replace injured pitcher Scott Olsen. On July 20 he made his major league debut, starting for the Nationals against the New York Mets. He pitched four innings and gave up five runs on eight hits, with one strikeout and no walks.

On August 9, Martin earned his first major league win as he pitched five innings and gave up one run on five hits. The Nationals beat the Arizona Diamondbacks 9–2 in Martin's fifth start. He ended the season with a 5–4 record, 37 strikeouts, 24 walks, and a 4.44 earned run average in 15 starts.

After the 2010 season, Martin was given his outright release, then signed a minor league contract with Washington. He spent the 2011 season in Syracuse, where he pitched in 30 games, including 14 starts, and posted an ERA of 3.93.

Miami Marlins
In December 2011, Martin signed a minor league contract with the Miami Marlins.

Tampa Bay Rays
On January 10, 2013, Martin signed a minor league contract with the Tampa Bay Rays. He spent the 2013 season starting for the Triple-A Durham Bulls. Martin's contract was selected by the Rays on September 22, 2013. He was designated for assignment the next day without appearing in a game.

Samsung Lions
Martin spent 2014 with the Samsung Lions of Korea Professional Baseball.

Chicago White Sox
Martin signed a minor league deal with the Chicago White Sox on January 22, 2015.

Lancaster Barnstormers
On April 1, 2016, Martin signed with the Lancaster Barnstormers of the Atlantic League of Professional Baseball. He was released on May 31, 2016.

Second Stint with Nationals
On June 9, 2016, Martin signed a minor league deal with the Washington Nationals. Taking advice from years earlier from then-Nationals pitching coordinator Spin Williams, Martin began throwing a knuckleball. He joined the Potomac Nationals and made his first start in the Carolina League in ten years on August 14 against Frederick. He was released on July 9, 2017.

Second stint with Rays
On February 14, 2018, Martin signed a minor league contract with the Tampa Bay Rays. He elected free agency on November 2, 2018.

Los Angeles Dodgers
On February 7, 2019, Martin signed a minor league contract with the Los Angeles Dodgers.

References

External links

Career statistics and player information from Korea Baseball Organization

1983 births
Living people
Baseball players from California
Major League Baseball pitchers
Washington Nationals players
Samsung Lions players
San Francisco Dons baseball players
Burlington Indians players (1986–2006)
Columbus RedStixx players
Kinston Indians players
Buffalo Bisons (minor league) players
Akron Aeros players
Mahoning Valley Scrappers players
Lake County Captains players
Syracuse Chiefs players
New Orleans Zephyrs players
Durham Bulls players
Lancaster Barnstormers players
KBO League pitchers
American expatriate baseball players in South Korea
People from Ridgecrest, California
Potomac Nationals players
Tulsa Drillers players
Oklahoma City Dodgers players